Strell is a surname. Notable people with the surname include:

Inge Strell (born 1947), Austrian figure skater
Joe Strell, American musician

See also
Stell (surname)